Smallhythe Place in Small Hythe, near Tenterden in Kent, is a half-timbered house built in the late 15th or early 16th century and since 1947 cared for by the National Trust.  The house was originally called 'Port House' and before the River Rother and the sea receded it served a thriving shipyard - in Old English hythe means "landing place".

It was the home of the Victorian actress Ellen Terry from 1899 to her death in the house in 1928. The house contains Ellen Terry's theatre collection, while the cottage grounds include her rose garden, orchard, nuttery and the working Barn Theatre.

Terry first saw the house in the company of Henry Irving, the manager of the Lyceum Theatre in London's Covent Garden, with whom she shared a famous theatrical partnership for nearly 24 years. The house was opened to the public by Terry's daughter Edith Craig in 1929, as a memorial to her mother. The National Trust supported Craig in her running of the museum from 1939, and took over the property when she died in 1947. It was designated as a Grade II* listed building by English Heritage on 8 May 1950.

Smallhythe Place contains many personal and theatrical mementoes, including two walls devoted to David Garrick and Sarah Siddons. Other exhibits include a message from Sarah Bernhardt, a chain worn by Fanny Kemble, Sir Arthur Sullivan's monocle and a visiting card from Alexandre Dumas. There are also several paintings by the artist Clare Atwood, one of the romantic companions of Edith Craig.

In an adjoining room is a letter from Oscar Wilde begging Terry to accept a copy of his first play. There is also a selection of sumptuous costumes dating from Terry's time at the Lyceum Theatre, in particular three costumes from Henry Irving's spectacular production of Much Ado About Nothing at the Lyceum Theatre.

Barn Theatre
In 1929, Craig set up a barn theatre in the house's grounds. The 70-seat theatre hosts around 30 productions a year.

Every year on the anniversary of Ellen Terry's death there has been a tradition of performing the plays of William Shakespeare. 
Among the actors who have performed in the theatre have been Peggy Ashcroft, Edith Evans, John Gielgud, Alec Guinness, Nigel Hawthorne, Rachel Kempson, Michael Redgrave, Paul Scofield and Sybil Thorndike.

The first patron of the Barn Theatre  was Ellen Terry's great-nephew Sir John Gielgud, who served in the role for 50 years before being succeeded by Donald Sinden, who was patron for 20 years until his death in 2014. He was succeeded by Joanna Lumley, who took up the role in March 2020.

References

External links
Smallhythe Place on the National Trust website
Smallhythe Place on The Heritage Trail website
3D scan from the National Trust

Historic house museums in Kent
National Trust properties in Kent
Biographical museums in Kent
Theatre museums
Museums established in 1929
1929 establishments in England
Grade II* listed houses
Grade II* listed buildings in Kent
Tudor architecture
Tenterden
Barn theatres